State Museum is a museum in Bhopal. It is located on Shymala Hills, Madhya Pradesh state of India. It is popular for its design and the best art and culture of Madhya Pradesh. The museum holds a very prominent role among the monuments and museums of Bhopal.

History 
The museum was established in 1964. Its new building was inaugurated on 2 November 2005, by the Madhya Pradesh Chief Minister, Shivraj Singh Chouhan. The building is an architectural marvel. The best of art is represented in the museum, along with the culture of the state.

Geography 

The museum includes 16 galleries, which have been categorised by theme. The galleries in the museum showcase some prehistoric articles and fossils including excavated objects, paintings, epigraphs, manuscripts, textiles, royal collection, sculptures, documents, artifacts associated with the freedom struggle, postal stamps, autographs, miniature paintings, coins, arms and weapons, etc.

The first postage stamp of the world, the Penny Black, which was issued in the year 1840, is also in the collection. The museum also has sculptures, mostly from the 8th to 12th century period. Black granite Buddha and the Yakshis from about 200 BC is also the part of the sculpture collection.

It also has a collection of about 80 Jain bronzes, which was founded in Dhar district of Malwa, in the 12th century. Dhar district is in the western side of Madhya Pradesh.  Another highlight of the museum is the collection of stone sculptures, which is from 6th to 10th century. A group of nine rock-cut Buddhist monuments called reproductions of muras is also the part of it.

Overview 
 The State Museum is considered as one of India's best designed museums of Madhya Pradesh. It includes a contemporary building designed to catch natural light as well as wide spaces accessible by ramps. The museum showcases a stimulating form of architecture. Inside the main building, there are 16 themed galleries and each of them prehistoric articles and fossils, paintings, manuscripts, military arms, ancient textiles, currencies and weapons, artifacts of the Royal families as well as articles. It is said that all of them are associated with the India's struggle for freedom.
 The museum also houses reproductions of the Buddhist paintings from the Bagh Caves, that were destroyed, as well as 84 rare Jain bronze articles from the 8th and 11th century. The museum also contains some miniature paintings with events from the Mahabharata and the Ramayana.

References 

Museums in Madhya Pradesh
Buildings and structures in Bhopal
Tourist attractions in Bhopal
Organisations based in Bhopal
Theatrical organisations in India
Libraries in India
1964 establishments in Madhya Pradesh